Griswold Lake is a glacial tarn in the Ruby Mountains of Elko County, Nevada, United States. It is within the Ruby Mountains Ranger District of the Humboldt-Toiyabe National Forest.

Griswold Lake is the principal source of Butterfield Creek, which flows down Hennen Canyon before exiting the mountains into Pleasant Valley. The lake is named after Chauncy "Chan" Griswold, an early rancher in Pleasant Valley and the father of Nevada Governor Morley Griswold. Butterfield Creek was also named after an early rancher, Henry Butterfield.

References

Ruby Mountains
Lakes of Nevada
Lakes of Elko County, Nevada
Lakes of the Great Basin
Humboldt–Toiyabe National Forest